Medieval is a 1998 computer wargame developed and published by Incredible Simulations.

Development
Medieval was developed at Incredible Simulations by Jeff Lapkoff, the company's owner and primary employee. He created the majority of the game by himself. It carries over interface design elements from Incredible's earlier ZuluWar! (1996).

Reception

According to William R. Trotter of PC Gamer US, Medieval won positive reviews from critics and "gained a passionate cult following." It was Incredible Simulations' most successful game at the time, which helped to establish the company financially.

References

External links
Official page (archived)

Computer wargames
Video games set in the Middle Ages